Charles Abel Heurtley (b Bishopwearmouth 4 January 1806; d Christ Church, Oxford 1 May 1895) was an English  theologian.

Heurtley was educated at Louth Grammar School and Corpus Christi College, Oxford, of which college he was a Fellow from 1832 to 1841 when he became Rector of Fenny Compton. He was Lady Margaret Professor of Divinity at Oxford from 1853 until his death.

References

1806 births
1895 deaths
People from Sunderland
19th-century Anglican theologians
19th-century English Anglican priests
19th-century English Christian theologians
19th-century English theologians
Alumni of Corpus Christi College, Oxford
Fellows of Corpus Christi College, Oxford
British theologians
Lady Margaret Professors of Divinity
People educated at King Edward VI Grammar School, Louth